Karagali is a rural locality (a selo) in Privolzhsky District, Astrakhan Oblast, Russia. The population was 2,734 as of 2017. There are 136 streets.

Geography 
Karagali is located 28 km southwest of Nachalovo (the district's administrative centre) by road. Tatarskaya Bashmakovka is the nearest rural locality.

References 

Rural localities in Privolzhsky District, Astrakhan Oblast